Leonidas T. Gama (September 15, 1959 - November 24, 2017) was a Tanzanian Chama Cha Mapinduzi politician and civil servant served as District and Regional Commissioner.

References

1959 births
2017 deaths
Tanzanian MPs 2015–2020
Chama Cha Mapinduzi politicians
Chama Cha Mapinduzi MPs